The 1959–60 Minneapolis Lakers season was the 12th season for the franchise in the NBA and final season in Minneapolis. The Lakers finished in third-place in the NBA Western Division with a record of 25–50, 21 games behind the St. Louis Hawks.  In their final season in the Twin Cities, the Lakers made the playoffs and defeated the Detroit Pistons two games to none in the Western Division Semifinals, before losing the West Finals to the Hawks, four games to three. The Lakers roster had 5 1st overall picks, Elgin Baylor, Hot Rod Hundley, Chuck Share, Ray Felix, and Frank Selvy, the most among any NBA teams in a season.

On January 18, the team had a harrowing flight in a snowstorm, returning to Minneapolis from St. Louis. The team's DC-3 had electrical problems and made an emergency landing in a cornfield near Carroll, Iowa.

On April 27, 1960, The NBA approved the relocation of the Lakers to Southern California and they became the Los Angeles Lakers for the 1960–61 season.

Regular season

Season standings

x – clinched playoff spot

Record vs. opponents

Game log

Playoffs

|- align="center" bgcolor="#ccffcc"
| 1
| March 12
| @ Detroit
| W 113–112
| Elgin Baylor (40)
| Grosse Pointe High School
| 1–0
|- align="center" bgcolor="#ccffcc"
| 2
| March 13
| Detroit
| W 114–99
| Frank Selvy (30)
| Minneapolis Armory
| 2–0
|-

|- align="center" bgcolor="#ffcccc"
| 1
| March 16
| @ St. Louis
| L 99–112
| Elgin Baylor (19)
| Baylor, Hundley (9)
| Kiel Auditorium8,377
| 0–1
|- align="center" bgcolor="#ccffcc"
| 2
| March 17
| @ St. Louis
| W 120–113
| Elgin Baylor (40)
| Elgin Baylor (14)
| Kiel Auditorium8,614
| 1–1
|- align="center" bgcolor="#ffcccc"
| 3
| March 19
| St. Louis
| L 89–93
| Elgin Baylor (27)
| —
| Minneapolis Armory
| 1–2
|- align="center" bgcolor="#ccffcc"
| 4
| March 20
| St. Louis
| W 103–101
| Elgin Baylor (39)
| Elgin Baylor (16)
| Minneapolis Armory6,852
| 2–2
|- align="center" bgcolor="#ccffcc"
| 5
| March 22
| @ St. Louis
| W 117–110 (OT)
| Elgin Baylor (40)
| Elgin Baylor (18)
| Kiel Auditorium10,043
| 3–2
|- align="center" bgcolor="#ffcccc"
| 6
| March 24
| St. Louis
| L 96–117
| Elgin Baylor (38)
| Frank Selvy (12)
| Minneapolis Armory
| 3–3
|- align="center" bgcolor="#ffcccc"
| 7
| March 26
| @ St. Louis
| L 86–97
| Elgin Baylor (33)
| Elgin Baylor (13)
| Kiel Auditorium6,195
| 3–4
|-

Awards and records
 Elgin Baylor, All-NBA First Team
 Elgin Baylor, NBA All-Star Game
 Dick Garmaker, NBA All-Star Game
 Rod Hundley, NBA All-Star Game

References

Los Angeles Lakers seasons
Minneapolis
Minnesota Lakers
Minnesota Lakers